Real estate in Bangladesh has developed dramatically in recent years due to the construction boom and increasing number of high-rise buildings in the major urban centres of the country, most notably Dhaka and Chittagong.

History
In 1991, REHAB (Real Estate and Housing Association of Bangladesh) was formed with only 19 members which later increased to 1,082, as of 2011. In 2000, National Housing Authority Act was adopted and approved by the national assembly and subsequently a new body named National Housing Authority was established, dissolving the former state organizations of Housing and Settlement Direction (HSD) and Deputy Commissioner Settlement (DCS). The act finally came into effect on 15 July 2001.

In Khulna, the Real estate business is growing because when the Padma bridge would be operational, Khulna will be the economical hub of Bangladesh.

References

External links
 Real Estate and Housing Association of Bangladesh